Illés may refer to:

People
 Béla Illés (born 1968), Hungarian footballer
 Béla Illés (writer) (1895-1974), Hungarian writer and journalist
 Jenö Illés (1877–1951), Hungarian-German cinematographer and film director
 György Illés (1914–2006), Hungarian cinematographer who collaborated with Zoltán Fábri
 Márton Illés (born 1975), Hungarian composer and pianist

Other uses
 Illés (band), Hungarian rock band (1960–1973)